Ponneri railway station is one of the railway stations of the Chennai Central–Gummidipoondi section of the Chennai Suburban Railway Network. It serves the neighbourhood of Ponneri, a suburb of Chennai, and is located 34 km north of Chennai Central railway station. It has an elevation of 15 m above sea level.

History
The lines at the station were electrified on 13 April 1979, with the electrification of the Chennai Central–Gummidipoondi section.

See also

 Chennai Suburban Railway

References

External links
 Ponneri railway station on IndiaRailInfo.com

Stations of Chennai Suburban Railway
Railway stations in Tiruvallur district